The 2023 Canadian Tire National Skating Championships were held on January 9-15, 2023 in Oshawa, Ontario. Medals were awarded in the disciplines of men's singles, women's singles, pairs, and ice dance on the senior, junior, and novice levels. The results were part of the Canadian selection criteria for the 2023 World Championships, the 2023 Four Continents Championships, and the 2023 World Junior Championships.

Oshawa was announced as the host in April 2022. The city has hosted the event once before, in 1952. Competitors qualified at the Skate Canada Challenge in December.

Entries 
A list of entries was posted prior to the competition.

Senior

Junior

Medal summary

Senior

Junior

Novice

Senior results

Senior men

Senior women

Senior pairs

Senior ice dance

Junior results

Junior men

Junior women

Junior pairs

Junior ice dance

Novice results

Novice men

Novice women

Novice pairs

Novice ice dance

International team selections

Four Continents Championships 
The 2023 Four Continents Championships will be held from February 7–12 in Colorado Springs, Colorado, United States of America. Teams will be selected using the International Teams Selection Criteria. The initial team selection was announced on January 15, 2023. The full list, including alternates, has been published by the ISU on January 18, 2023.

World Junior Championships 
Commonly referred to as "Junior Worlds", the 2023 World Junior Championships will be held from February 27–March 5 in Calgary, Alberta. Teams will be selected using the International Teams Selection Criteria. The initial team selection was announced on January 15, 2023. The full list, including alternates, was published by the ISU on February 7, 2023.

World Championships 
The 2023 World Championships will be held from March 20-26 in Saitama, Japan. Teams will be selected using the International Teams Selection Criteria. The initial team selection was announced on January 15, 2023. The full list, including alternates, was published by the ISU on February 28, 2023.

Notes

References

External links  
 2023 Canadian Championships: Senior and junior results via Skate Canada
 2023 Canadian Championships: Novice results via Skate Canada

Canadian Figure Skating Championships
Figure skating
Canadian Figure Skating Championships
Canadian Figure Skating Championships